Agege Stadium is a multi-purpose stadium in Lagos, Nigeria. It has a seating capacity of 4,000. It is the home ground of MFM F.C., Nigeria women's national under-17 football team and since 2018, of DreamStar F.C. Ladies.

State Government of Lagos says that efforts are being made to complete their up-gradation of the stadium in February, as reported by the Nigerian news agency.

The Lagos Stadium is home to Nigeria Women Premier League club DreamStar F.C. Ladies, and Nigeria Premier League Club MFM, who represented the country at the 2017
CAF Champion League, along with Plateau United.

The Verified Creative House, marketing and branding company, held its trade fair in Agege stadium, in Agege Local Government Area of Lagos State, from July 1-7.

Gallery

See also 
 List of stadiums in Nigeria

References

Football venues in Nigeria
Sports venues in Lagos